The following is a list of films shot fully or partially on Long Island.

References

Films shot on Long Island
Films shot on
Long Island